The Q4 bus route constitutes a public transit corridor running along Merrick Boulevard and the easternmost portion of Linden Boulevard in southeastern Queens, New York City. The route runs from the Jamaica Center–Parsons/Archer station to Cambria Heights near the Queens–Nassau County border. The Q4 also provides limited-stop service along the corridor during peak weekday hours. The route is now operated by MTA Regional Bus Operations under the New York City Transit brand.

What is now the Q4 began service in November 1919, running from Jamaica to 201st Street in St. Albans. The franchise was extended to 223rd Street in Cambria Heights in 1931. The Q4 was originally operated by Bee-Line Incorporated and later the North Shore Bus Company until 1947. The Jamaica terminal has been changed several times throughout the route's history.

Route description and service
The Q4 begins at Bay C of the Jamaica Center Bus Terminal. It runs east on Archer Avenue to Merrick Boulevard, then south along Merrick Boulevard to Linden Boulevard. The Q4 then diverges east along Linden Boulevard, running through St. Albans and Cambria Heights. The route terminates at 235th Street adjacent to the Cross Island Parkway, which marks the border with North Valley Stream in Nassau County. Travel into Nassau County requires walking several blocks east to Elmont Road to transfer to the n1 route of the Nassau Inter-County Express.

During weekday rush-hour periods, the Q4 employs limited-stop service. These buses skip all stops north of Liberty Avenue and Merrick Boulevard, using a bypass via 160th Street and Liberty Avenue, and make all local stops east of Francis Lewis Boulevard (near Springfield Boulevard). Limited-stop buses operate in both directions during AM rush hours, and towards Cambria Heights only during PM rush hours (during summer weekdays: mornings toward Jamaica and afternoons toward Cambria Heights). During the morning rush period, alternate peak-direction (Jamaica-bound) local buses begin service at Francis Lewis Boulevard.

The Q4 operates out of the Jamaica Bus Depot on Merrick Boulevard near Jamaica Center, as do several other routes in southeast Queens.

Express bus service

The  express bus begins at 235th Street, running along Linden Boulevard to Farmers Boulevard. It then runs on Farmers Boulevard, Liberty Avenue, the Van Wyck Expressway, and Queens Boulevard towards Midtown Manhattan.

History

What is now the Q4 began service in November 1919, running from Union Hall Street station in Jamaica along Merrick Road (Merrick Boulevard) and Central Avenue (also known as Foch Boulevard or Westchester Avenue; today's Linden Boulevard) to Bank Street (now 201st Street) in St. Albans, just west of Francis Lewis Boulevard. In December 1923, Bee Line, Inc started operating the route. At this time, service on the eastern portion of the line to Springfield Avenue (Springfield Boulevard) was provided by Bee Line's Farmers Avenue (Farmers Boulevard) route (today's ). The exception was a three-week period in July 1927, when Merrick Boulevard-Central Avenue service was extended east to Springfield during construction on Farmers Avenue.

Bee Line originally operated from 163rd Street and Jamaica Avenue in the Jamaica business district. On October 1, 1930, the Bee Line routes began terminating at the newly constructed Jamaica Union Bus Terminal near its former terminus. The new bus terminal was located at Jamaica Avenue and New York Boulevard (now Guy R. Brewer Boulevard), adjacent to the Union Hall Street station. As constituted in December 1930, the Jamaica-St. Albans route (designated Route No. 4) ran along Merrick Road and Central Avenue to Farmers Boulevard, south along Farmers to 119th Avenue, then east along 119th Avenue (the current  route) to 196th Street. In January 1931, the city altered the franchise (designated "Q-4") to continue on Central Avenue to 223rd Street in Cambria Heights.

On August 11, 1936, the Bee-Line routes were moved to the newly opened 165th Street Bus Terminal (then the Long Island Bus Terminal). In early 1939, the Q4 franchise was awarded to North Shore Bus Company; at this time, the Cambria Heights Civic Association requested an extension of the route from 227th Street to 236th Street at the Nassau County border. In May 1939, Bee-Line relinquished its Queens routes including the Q4. These routes began operation from the terminal under North Shore Bus Company on June 25, 1939, as part of the company's takeover of nearly all routes in Zone D (Jamaica and Southeast Queens). The northern terminus of the Q4, Q4A (predecessor to the Q84), Q5, and Q5A was moved once again to Hillside Avenue and 168th Street, near the 169th Street station of the IND Queens Boulevard Line, on October 27, 1939.

In early 1945, the Q4 was extended from 227th Street to its current terminus at 235th Street near the county line. At this time, short run service was operated to Francis Lewis Boulevard. Following the extension, the route was frequented by residents of nearby Valley Stream towards Jamaica. This led to crowding on the route and complaints from Queens passengers. On March 30, 1947, North Shore Bus would be taken over by the New York City Board of Transportation (later the New York City Transit Authority [NYCTA]), making the bus routes city operated. Under municipal operations, service on the Q4 was increased on April 3 of that year.

On October 5, 1983, the NYCTA held a public hearing on a proposal to introduce zone express service on the Q4, with short-line local service from Francis Lewis Boulevard. With the addition of seven buses in the a.m., service would run every two minutes from Francis Lewis Boulevard. Buses would be added to allow service to run every three minutes in the evening. On December 11, 1988, in conjunction with the opening of the Archer Avenue Subway, the northern terminal of the Q4, Q4A, and the other Merrick Boulevard routes was moved to the Jamaica Center Bus Terminal. The same day, the Q4A was renumbered Q84. In January 1993, the Merrick Boulevard routes began traveling on Archer Avenue in both directions; previously, northbound buses traveled along Archer Avenue, while southbound buses traveled via Jamaica Avenue. In September 2003, limited service on the Q4, Q5, and Q85 was expanded during AM rush hours, beginning earlier in the morning. On January 14, 2004, the MTA instituted the current limited-stop bypass in the Jamaica business district via Liberty Avenue and 160th Street. Reverse-peak limited-stop service was also added to the Q4 during morning hours.

In December 2019, the MTA released a draft redesign of the Queens bus network. As part of the redesign, the Q4 would have been replaced by a "subway connector" bus route, the QT40, with a nonstop section on Merrick Boulevard. The redesign was delayed due to the COVID-19 pandemic in New York City in 2020, and the original draft plan was dropped due to negative feedback. A revised plan was released in March 2022. As part of the new plan, the Q4 would mostly keep its existing route but will have a nonstop section on Merrick Boulevard. At its eastern end, the Q4 would be extended into Elmont, New York.

See also

 Merrick Boulevard buses

References

Q004
004
1919 establishments in New York City